David Navarro Brugal (born 17 May 1983) is a Spanish professional basketball player for Monbus Obradoiro of the Spanish Liga ACB.

Professional career
After spending his first years as professional mainly in Catalonia, Navarro made his debut in Liga ACB in 2005 with Bàsquet Manresa.

He came back to LEB Oro for playing with Sant Josep Girona, before coming back to the top tier with Valencia Basket in February 2011.

In 2013, Navarro agreed terms with River Andorra, where he became captain of the club after several years in the team of the Principality. In his first season, Andorra conquered the title of the 2012–13 LEB Oro season.

On June 28, 2017, Navarro signed a two-year contract with Obradoiro CAB.

International career
After living four years in Andorra, Navarro was declared able for playing with the Andorra national team, as a result of a special eligibility rule from FIBA Europe for small countries.

He made his debut in May 2017, at the 2017 Games of the Small States of Europe in San Marino.

References

External links
ACB Profile

1983 births
Living people
Andorran men's basketball players
Bàsquet Manresa players
BC Andorra players
Basketball players from Catalonia
CB Clavijo players
CB Valladolid players
Ciudad de Vigo Básquet players
Club Melilla Baloncesto players
Liga ACB players
Menorca Bàsquet players
Obradoiro CAB players
People from Esparreguera
Sportspeople from the Province of Barcelona
Spanish men's basketball players
Valencia Basket players
Shooting guards
Naturalised citizens of Andorra